Triominoes is a variant of dominoes using triangular tiles published in 1965. A popular version of this game is marketed as Tri-Ominos by the Pressman Toy Corp.

Composition
Each point of the triangle has a number (most often from 0 to 5, as in the Pressman version), and each triomino has a unique combination of numbers (with repetition of a number allowed in the combination). With the 6 possible end values commonly seen, and with the additional condition that the 3 numbers do not decrease clockwise, there are 56 unique combinations, and thus the standard triomino set has 56 tiles. Larger sets are possible; including 6 as a possible end number would result in 84 tiles.

Tiles are most often made from plastic or resin that approximates the feel of stone or ivory, similar to most modern commercial domino sets. Numbers are recessed into the surface and painted black. Some "deluxe" sets include a raised brass tack head in the center, which assists in mixing up or shuffling tiles, as the tack head reduces the surface area of the tile contacting the table, so tiles move more freely.

Playing the game
A valid play of a triomino is similar to that of a domino in that the sides contacting each other must have matching numbers; two numbers must match. A side with a 1 and a 2 will often not match the side the player is attempting to match. Points are scored based on the numbers on the tile played, with high scores when special placements are made.

At the start of the game, all of the tiles are placed face down and shuffled. Players randomly draw their starting pieces. The specific number depends upon the number of players: a two-player game uses nine pieces per player to start, three or four players use seven pieces, and five or six players use six pieces. One player keeps score for all, using columns for each player and cumulative scores.

The player who draws the largest "triple" (all three numbers the same on the tile), begins the game by placing that tile. He scores 10 points plus the total value of the tile. The exception is that if the player with the highest triple tile held also holds a triple zero (or if the triple zero is the only triple held) and the opponent or opponents hold no triples, then that player plays the triple zero and earns 40 points. If no triple is held the player with the highest single tile value plays it and scores its value without the 10 point bonus. When players hold tiles with the same value the next highest counts and so on until there is the highest value tile.

In turn, clockwise, each player places a new tile that lines up with the placed tiles. To place a tile, two of the three numbers must align with the adjacent tile. If the tile is placed such that it would touch two other tiles, then all of the adjacent numbers must match. Where the points of tiles meet the numbers must always be the same; if they are not, someone has been allowed to misplace a tile and the round must be restarted.

If a player cannot place a piece he/she must draw a new piece. Each tile drawn penalizes the player 5 points. Players must continue to draw until a matching tile is found or until they have drawn three tiles. If none of these three tiles can be placed the penalty is 25 points. If one of the three can be placed the score is the value of the tile less the penalty (may be a plus or minus sum).

Point scores

After placing a tile, add each number on the tile to score. (E.g. 5 + 3 + 1 = 9).

When a player can place a tile that completes a hexagonal shape (i.e. the 6th piece & all 3 numbers match), score the tile's points plus a bonus of 50 points, less any penalty if pieces have been drawn. If a player completes two hexagons in one move the player receives 100 points. Bridges are made by matching one side of the tile and the point opposite. Score the tile's points plus a 40-point bonus, less any penalty if pieces have been drawn.

If a player is unable to place a tile when none remain to be drawn he loses 10 points. If there are two tiles left, he may draw them (penalty 10) and if he still cannot play, the end penalty is incurred (total penalty 10 + 10).  The round ends when no player can place a tile (whether or not all the face-down tiles have been drawn), or one player runs out of tiles. A player who places his last tile gains 25 bonus points, plus the total of all of the remaining tiles his opponents have yet to play. If the round ends because no one can place a piece, then the player with the lowest tile total value gains the value in excess of his from each other player, but no bonus. (E.g. my tiles’ total value is 15. Other players have tile total value 23 - I get 23 - 15 = 8, value 27 - I get 27 - 15 = 12, and so on).

Further rounds are played until one player reaches a total of 400 points. He is not yet the winner, and may not be: this only signals that this is the last round, even if penalties later reduce his total below 400. The winner is the one who has the most points at the end of this last round.

The game includes only 56 out of 76 possible tiles, omitting those tiles in which the numbers appear in clockwise descending order.  Consequently, there are many situations in which no tile completes a bridge or hexagon. This is the case because the play has only one of two stereotypes of those tiles that can have Cis–trans isomerism, i.e. with three different numbers on the tile. In that case, with only one of the stereotypes,  there are 21 tiles with one or more of a particular number e.g. there are 21 tiles with one or more "5". There are 6 tiles with any combination of two numbers e.g. there are 6 tiles with one or more 4 and one or more 5. The count to arrive at 56 tiles goes then as follows: 21 with at least one 5, 15 with at least one 4 (and no 5), 10 with at least one 3 (and no 4 or 5), 6 with at least one 2 (and no 3,4 or 5), 3 with at least one 1 (and no 2,3,4, or 5), and finally 1 with at least one 0 (and no 1,2,3,4, or 5). The last one is the triple zero obviously.  

Much depends on the luck of the draw, but skill plays a part, even if a small one. Players should be aware that they hold a matching tile or tiles and need to decide whether or not to play them or in which order to play them for their best advantage. They should be aware of potential hexagons or bridges, to avoid misplacing a tile that could be valuable. A player may consider it worthwhile to set up potential hexagons and bridges since this may or may not be to his own benefit; they may even hold the necessary tile to use in his next move. He may feel that placing a tile to which others can be matched is preferable to placing it to form an "impossible" hexagon or bridge.

Mobile application 
In 2009, an app for the iPhone was launched which licensed the Tri-ominos brand from Pressman. A new app was launched in 2015, coinciding with Triominos' 50th anniversary.

Variants 
Variants manufactured by Pressman have included "Quad-Ominos", with square-shaped tiles, and "Picture Tri-Ominos".

References

External links
 

	
Board games introduced in 1965
Game equipment
Tile-based board games
Pressman Toy Corporation games